is a 2005 Japanese horror film directed by Ataru Oikawa. It is the sixth installment of the Tomie film series, based on a manga of the same name by Junji Ito, more specifically the chapter Revenge.

Plot
The story revolves around a young, female doctor, Kazue (Hisako Shirata), and an unidentified, naked and wounded woman (Anri Ban) she runs down on the road one night. The girl leads Kazue to an abandoned house filled with bodies, madmen and an unconscious girl. The unconscious girl, Yukiko (Minami) is near death and wrapped in a sleeping bag. Kazue takes Yukiko back to her clinic.

One year later, a federal investigator visits Kazue, having found out about her meeting the naked and wounded woman. He explains that the woman, named Tomie, cannot die and murders happen all around her due to her beauty causing insanity. Tomie, meanwhile, is beginning a ritual revenge plan.

Cast
 Hisako Shirata as Kazue Kae
 Minami Hinase as Yukiko Fuyuki
 Anri Ban as Tomie Kawakami
 Hitoshi Kato as Tetsuya Tanimura
 Shoji Shibuya	as Inspector Yamazaki
 Itsuko Suzuki as Inspector Toyama

References

External links
 
 Review at SaruDama

2005 horror films
2005 films
Films directed by Ataru Oikawa
Japanese horror films
Japanese sequel films
Live-action films based on manga
Tomie (film series)
2000s Japanese films